Patrick Cotter may refer to:

 Patrick Cotter O'Brien (1760–1806), Irish giant
 Patrick Cotter (croquet player) (1904–1996), croquet player from Ireland
 Patrick Cotter (poet) (born 1963), Irish poet
 Patrick Cotter (priest), Australian priest